Unioninae is a subfamily of freshwater mussels in the family Unionidae. This superfamily has a wide distribution, being found throughout Eurasia, North America (including Central America) and Africa.

Systematics 
The following classification is based on MolluscaBase and the MUSSEL Project database:

 Tribe Anodontini Rafinesque, 1820
 Genus Alasmidonta Say, 1818
 Genus Anodonta Lamarck, 1799
 Genus Anodontoides C. T. Simpson, 1898
 Genus Arcidens C. T. Simpson, 1900
 Genus †Cyclanodonta Starobogatov, 1970 
 Genus Lasmigona Rafinesque, 1831
 Genus Lepidodesma C. T. Simpson, 1896
 Genus †Modelliella Starobogatov, 1970 
 Genus Pegias C. T. Simpson, 1900
 Genus Pseudanodonta Bourguignat, 1877
 Genus Pseudodontoideus Frierson, 1927
 Genus Pyganodon Crosse & P. Fischer, 1894
 Genus †Sichuanoconcha X.-Z. Liu, 1984 
 Genus Simpsonaias Frierson, 1914
 Genus Simpsonella Cockerell, 1903
 Genus Strophitus Rafinesque, 1820
 Genus Utterbackia F. C. Baker, 1927
 Genus Utterbackiana Frierson, 1927
 Tribe Cristariini Lopes-Lima, Bogan & Froufe, 2017
 Genus Amuranodonta Moskvicheva, 1973
 Genus Anemina F. Haas, 1969
 Genus Beringiana Starobogatov in Zatravkin, 1983
 Genus Buldowskia Moskvicheva, 1973
 Genus Cristaria Schumacher, 1817
 Genus Pletholophus C. T. Simpson, 1900
 Genus Sinanodonta Modell, 1945
 Tribe Lanceolariini Froufe, Lopes-Lima & Bogan, 2017
 Genus Lanceolaria Conrad, 1853
 Tribe Middendorffinaiini Lopes-Lima, Bolotov & Bogan, 2020
 Genus Middendorffinaia Moskvicheva & Starobogatov, 1973
 Tribe Nodulariini Starobogatov & Zatravkin, 1987
 Genus Cuneopsis C. T. Simpson, 1900
 Genus Inversiunio Habe, 1991
 Genus Nodularia Conrad, 1853
 Genus Pseudocuneopsis X. Huang, Y. Dai, Z. Chen & X. Wu, 2022
 Genus Schistodesmus C. T. Simpson, 1900
 Genus Tchangsinaia Starobogatov, 1970
 Tribe Unionini Rafinesque, 1820
 Genus Aculamprotula X.-P. Wu, Y.-L. Liang, H.-Z. Wang & S. Ouyang, 1999
 Genus Acuticosta C. T. Simpson, 1900
 Genus †Betekeia Starobogatov, 1970
 Genus Diaurora Cockerell, 1903
 Genus †Heterunio Lindholm, 1932
 Genus †Modellinaia Starobogatov, 1970
 Genus †Palindonaia Modell, 1950 
 Genus †Pristinunio Starobogatov, 1970 
 Genus Protunio P. Haas, 1913
 Genus Pseudobaphia C. T. Simpson, 1900
 Genus Rhombuniopsis F. Haas, 1920
 Genus †Rumanunio Starobogatov, 1970
 Genus †Sculptunio Lindholm, 1932
 Genus †Sibirunio Starobogatov, 1970
 Genus †Tuberunio Lindholm, 1932
 Genus Unio Philipsson, 1788
The MUSSEL Project database and ITIS instead only divide the subfamily into three tribes.

References 

Unionidae
Protostome subfamilies
Taxa named by Constantine Samuel Rafinesque